Songs of Sinatra is a 2005 studio album by Steve Tyrell that has him singing his renditions of Frank Sinatra.

Track listing
"I Get a Kick Out of You" (Cole Porter)  - 4:01
"I Concentrate on You" (Porter)  - 3:07
"Fly Me to the Moon" (Bart Howard)  - 2:44
"Witchcraft" (Cy Coleman, Carolyn Leigh)  - 3:13
"In the Wee Small Hours of the Morning" (Bob Hilliard, David Mann)  - 3:10
"The One I Love (Belongs to Somebody Else)" [with Frank Sinatra, Jr.] (Isham Jones, Gus Kahn)  - 2:47
"(I've Got You) Under My Skin" (Porter)  - 3:47
"Bewitched, Bothered and Bewildered (Richard Rodgers, Lorenz Hart)  - 4:26
"Night and Day" (Porter)  - 3:47
"All the Way" (Sammy Cahn, Jimmy Van Heusen)  - 3:41
"Nice 'n' Easy" (Alan Bergman, Marilyn Bergman, Lew Spence)  - 3:36
"Somethin' Stupid" (Carson Parks)  - 2:44
"All of Me" (Gerald Marks, Seymour Simons)  - 3:35
"You Go to My Head" (J. Fred Coots, Haven Gillespie)  - 4:23

2005 albums
Steve Tyrell albums
Frank Sinatra tribute albums
Hollywood Records albums